Bojan Šarčević (born 1974) is a visual artist. His work includes video, installations, site-responsive architectural interventions, photographic collage, more or less abstract sculpture, and printed publications. Bojan Šarčević is represented by Stuart Shave/Modern Art, London.

Life
Born in Belgrade, Šarčević spent part of his childhood in Morocco and Algeria, but was living in Sarajevo at the outbreak of the Bosnian war. Šarčević studied at École des Beaux-Arts in Paris, graduating in 1997. He continued his studies at Rijksakademie in Amsterdam.

He has been a professor at Beaux-Arts de Paris since 2016 and a tutor at the postgraduate program deAteliers in Amsterdam since 2008.

Solo exhibitions
Šarčević held his first solo exhibition "It seems that an animal is in the world as water in the water", at the gallery BQ in Cologne. Since then he has had numerous solo and group exhibitions, including:

Solo Exhibitions

2020
BQ, Berlin, Germany
2018
 "Sentimentality is the core", Modern Art, London
2016
 "'invagination'", Modern Art, London
2015
 "'In the rear view mirror'", BQ, Berlin, Germany 
2014
 "'In the rear view mirror'", Pinksummer, Genova, Italy
2013
 "'Gyrobifastigium'", Modern Art, London
2012
 "'L’ellipse d’ellipse'", Institut d'art Contemporain, Villeurbanne, France 
 "'Rhombic Oath'", Leopold Hoesch Museum, Duren, Germany 
 "'A Curious Contortion in the Method of Progress'", Kunstmuseum Liechtenstein, Vaduz, Liechtenstein
2011
"'At Present'", BQ, Berlin, Germany
2010
 "'Come des chiens et des vagues'", Modern Art, London
 "'Involuntary Twitch'", de Vleeshal, Middelburg, Netherlands
 "'Le Grand Café'", St. Nazaire, France
 "'Pink Summer'", Genova, Italy
 "'At Present'", BQ, Berlin, Germany
2009
 "'The breath-taker is the breath-giver'", Galerie Carlier Gebauer, Berlin, Germany
2008
 "'Only After Dark'", Kunstverein Hamburg, Germany
 "'Already vanishing'", MAMBO, Bologna, Italy (exhb. cat.)
2007
 "'Only After Dark'", Le Credac, Ivry, France
 "'untitled'", BQ, Cologne, Germany
 "'Kissing the back of your hand sounds like a wounded bird'", Bawag Foundation, Vienna, Austria (exhb. cat.)
 "'Already Vanishing'", MAMbo, Bologna, Italy
2006
 "'Sometimes a man gets carried away'", Kunstverein Heilbronn, Heilbronn, Germany
 "'To what extent should an artist understand the implications of his or her findings?'", Project Arts Centre, Dublin and The Model Arts – Niland Gallery, Sligo, Ireland (exhb. cat.)
 "'Replace the Irreplaceable'", Gallery Carlier Gebauer, Berlin, Germany
2005
 "'Wanting without needing, Loving without leaning'", ArtPace Fondation, San Antonio, TX, USA
 "'Keep the illusion for the end'", BQ, Cologne, Germany (exhb. cat.)
 "'Everything makes sense in the reverse'", Pinksummer, Genova, Italy
2004
 "'1954'", Galerie Carlier Gebauer, Berlin, Germany
2003
 "'Verticality Downwards'", Kunstverein Munich, Munich, Germany (exhb. cat.)
 "'Where the hand doesn’t enter'", heat infuses, IAC Institut d’Art Contemporain, Villeurbane/Lyon, France
2002
 "'Spirit of Versatility and Inclusiveness'", BQ, Cologne, Germany (exhb. cat.)
 "'Rien ne peut venir que d’ailleurs'", Centre d’Art Contemporain Bretigny, Bretigny sur Orge, France (exhb. cat.)
 "'Pinksummer'", Genova, Italy
 "'Inova'", Milwaukee, WI, USA
 "'TBA Inc.'", Chicago, IL, USA
2001
 "'Eingang Links'", Kunstverein Dusseldorf, Dusseldorf, Germany 
 Gallery Gebauer, Berlin, Germany
 "'Cover Versions'", Stedelijk Museum Bureau Amsterdam, Amsterdam, Netherlands (exhb. cat.)
2000
 "'Strange, I’ve seen that face before'", Modern Institute, Glasgow
"'Favourite cloths worn while she or he worked'", Gesellschaft fur Aktuelle Kunst, Bremen, Germany (exhb. cat.)
1999
 "'It seems that an animal is in the world as water in the water'", BQ, Cologne, and Kunsthalle Lophem, Bruges, Belgium (exhb. cat.)
 "'Irrigation-Fertilisation'", Salon 3, London

Selected collections

21st Century Museum of Contemporary Art, Kanazawa, Japan

Daimler Contemporary, Berlin, Germany

Dallas Museum of Art, Dallas, TX, USA

Fondazione Morra Greco, Naples, Italy

FRAC Auvergne, Clermont-Ferrand, France

FRAC Poitou-Charentes, Angoulême, France

Institut d’art contemporain, Villeurbanne, France

Kiasma – Museum of Contemporary Art, Helsinki, Finland

Kunstmuseum Liechtenstein, Vaduz, Liechtenstein

MUDAM – Musée d’Art Moderne Grand-Duc Jean, Luxembourg City, Luxembourg

Museum Abteiberg, Mönchengladbach, Germany

MMK – Museum für Moderne Kunst, Frankfurt am Main, Germany

Sammlung Boros, Berlin, Germany

Sammlung Haubrok, Berlin, Germany

TBA21 – Thyssen-Bornemisza Art Contemporary, Vienna, Austria

References

Martin Herbert, "Unbounded Enthusiasms" Artforum, November 2010
Jeniffer Allen, "Social Patterns, Frieze, issue 117, 2008
Christy Lange, "Une Heureuse Régression", Frieze, issue 97, 2006
Kirsty Bell, Bojan Šarčević, Frieze, issue 85, 2004
Jörg Heiser, "Dogs in Space", Frieze, issue 55, 2000

External links
Bojan Šarčević's site
Stuart Shave/Modern Art

Serbian contemporary artists
1974 births
Living people
Artists from Belgrade
Date of birth missing (living people)
École des Beaux-Arts alumni